Lipie  is a village in the administrative district of Gmina Radomsko, within Radomsko County, Łódź Voivodeship, in central Poland.

The village has a population of 160.

References

Lipie